De Arend (English: The Eagle) is a windmill located on the Akkerstraat 11 in Wouw, Roosendaal, in the province of North Brabant, Netherlands. Built in 1811 on an artificial hill, the windmill functioned as a gristmill. The mill is a national monument (nr 39624) since 24 June 1971.

History 
The mill was built in 1811 by order of Jacobus Aerden, who took the opportunity to build a mill right after the molendwang, a system in which local peasants were obligated to use a certain local mill, was discontinued by the French revolutionaries. The mill burned down in 1825 and was rebuilt that same year. In 1914, the de Aerden family sold the mill to Jacobus Potters, whose family still owns the mill.

Public access 
The mill is still in use and is open to public viewing on Tuesdays and Saturdays between 10:00 and 16:00.

Gallery of images

References 

Windmills in North Brabant
Rijksmonuments in North Brabant
Tower mills in the Netherlands
Grinding mills in the Netherlands
Windmills completed in 1811
Roosendaal